Never Left may refer to:

"Never Left" (song), 2021 song by Lil Tecca
Never Left, 2015 album by Sadat X

See also
Neva Left, 2017 album by Snoop Dogg